Wireless tower can refer to 

Telegraph station
Cell site or cell tower
Radio tower
Communication tower